The Specialized High Schools Admissions Test (SHSAT) is an examination administered to eighth and ninth grade students residing in New York City and used to determine admission to eight of the city's nine Specialized High Schools. An average of 25,000 students take the test to apply to these schools and around 5,000 are accepted. The test is given each year in October and November, and students are informed of their results the following March. Those who receive offers decide by the middle of March whether to attend the school the following September. The test is independently produced and graded by American Guidance Service, a subsidiary of Pearson Education, under contract to the New York City Department of Education.

Applicability 
The SHSAT is used for admission to the following schools:

Bronx High School of Science
Brooklyn Latin School
Brooklyn Technical High School
High School of American Studies at Lehman College
High School for Math, Science and Engineering at City College
Queens High School for the Sciences at York College
Staten Island Technical High School
Stuyvesant High School

Admission to the remaining specialized high school, Fiorello H. LaGuardia High School of Music & Art and Performing Arts, is determined by audition or portfolio rather than by exam.

The Hecht-Calandra Act 
The Hecht-Calandra Act of 1971 codified the SHSAT into state law as the sole consideration for admissions at 3 of the specialized schools, Stuyvesant, Brooklyn Tech, and Bronx Science.

The debate of whether or not the SHSAT and specialized schools are discriminatory dates back to the passing of this act. In the 1970s the chancellor of the New York City public school system Harvey B. Scribner launched a study to investigate allegations that the specialized schools were “culturally biased” against Latino and Black students. In response to the study legislators came together to draft the Hecht-Calandra Act. The minority legislators who were against the bill “accused white colleagues of seeking an exclusionary racial quota at the schools”.

In 2018, then Mayor of New York City Bill de Blasio proposed changes to the admission process of the Specialized High School. One of the proposed changes was repealing the Hecht-Calandra Act and replacing the SHSAT with a more holistic approach that takes more aspects of a students education into consideration.  However the change did not happen. Due to the act, the city is not allowed to remove the SHSAT and would require a state law to change it.

There is a legal question on whether the city has the power to reclassify the 5 other specialized schools that are not explicitly mentioned in the 1971 bill in order to  change the admission process.

New York State Senate Bill S3087, sponsored in 2021 by State Senator Julia Salazar, seeks to repeal the Hecht-Calandra Act. The bill, as well as previous iterations of it, point to the fact that no other school district in the state of New York is subject to state laws. Furthermore, the bill claims that the 1971 act "help to maintain or increase the racially disparate enrollment in these schools, particularly in regard to Black and Latinx students" and that its purpose was to "further school segregation in NYC". The bill would allow the city to create its own admission process for the specialized schools.

Testing locations
The test is given in late October (8th grade) or early November (9th grade and 8th grade with IEP's, 504 plans, and ELL). The test is administered at testing centers located in Manhattan at Stuyvesant High School, in the Bronx at Bronx High School of Science, in Brooklyn at Brooklyn Technical High School, Sunset Park High School, or James Madison High School, in Queens at Long Island City High School, Hillcrest High School, or John Adams High School, in Staten Island at Staten Island Technical High School.

Admission 
Students must choose which schools they wish to apply to (up to 8) and indicate them in order of preference on an application portal before the day of the exam. The test is offered to all eighth and ninth grade students residing within New York City, but the majority of the applicants are eighth graders.

The results of the SHSAT are ordered from the highest score to the lowest score. The list is processed in order by score, with each student being placed in their most-preferred school that still has open seats, and continuing until there are no remaining open seats at any school. The grading of the test is not proportional to the raw score and is formulized by the New York City Department of Education.

Examination format 
The SHSAT tests for grammar and ability in both English and mathematics. The examination is 180 minutes long. It is recommended that 90 minutes be divided for each section, but the time can be divided in any way students wish: however, if a student qualifies for an IEP the time may be increased. There is no break between the sections. Electronic calculators and other calculation aids may not be used during the test.

ELA
57 multiple choice questions:
9-11 revising/editing
5-6 nonfiction (2-3) and fiction (2-3) passages with a total of 46-48 questions
All questions are multiple choice questions

Mathematics 
52 multiple choice questions and 5 grid-in questions:
Various mathematical topics tested
Basic math
Algebra
Factoring
Substitution
Geometry 
Basic Coordinate Graphing 
Logic
Word Problems
3D Geometry

Grading 
There is no penalty for wrong answers. The total number of correct answers (the raw score) is converted into a scaled score through a formula that the Department of Education does not release, and which varies from year to year. The scaled score is an integer between 20 and around 350. The scaled score is then used to determine the composite score, which varies from year to year, an integer between 40 to around 700. , is used to determine a student's standing. The scaled score is not proportional to the raw scores.

Typically, scoring around 99 percentile (45-47/47) and a 60 percentile (25-27/47) will gain admission into a specialized high school, while 82 percentile (32/47) on both will not be enough for a specialized high school. As a student is closer to getting every question (45 to 46 to 47/47) (or every wrong), the scaled score increases by 10-20 points, while in the middle range scores (18-36/47), scaled scores only increase by 2-3 points. The maximum scaled score for each section (ELA and Math) is around 350 (usually lower for 9th graders). An example of a scoring sheet (97+ percentile and 50+ percentile) is shown below:
47/47: 350; 46/47: 330; 45/47: 310; 44/47: 300; 43/47: 290 --- 33/47: 220; 32/47: 218; 31/47: 215; 30/47: 213; 29/47: 210; 28/47: 208; 27/47: 206; 26/47: 203.

The cut-off scores for each school vary yearly, determined simply by the number of open places in each school and how the candidates score. Students are notified of their scores in March. The Department of Education usually does not publish score results; the numbers below are self-reported by interested parents on public forums. However, the DOE released the cut-off scores for each Specialized High School for the 2022 results (for which the tests themselves were taken in 2021).

In 2020, the cutoff scores were the following: Stuyvesant High School: 566; Queens High School For The Sciences At York College: 535; The Bronx High School of Science: 532; Staten Island Technical High School: 551; HSMSE @ CCNY: 523; HSAS @ Lehman: 520; Brooklyn Technical High School: 507; and The Brooklyn Latin School: 498.

In 2021, the cutoff scores were the following: Stuyvesant High School: 560; Queens High School For The Sciences At York College: 482; The Bronx High School of Science: 517; Staten Island Technical High School: 525; HSMSE @ CCNY: 515; HSAS @ Lehman: 488; Brooklyn Technical High School: 492; and The Brooklyn Latin School: 481. The lower cutoff scores can be attributed to the reduced number of test-takers.

In 2022, the cutoff scores were the following: Stuyvesant High School: 563; Queens High School For The Sciences At York College: 523; The Bronx High School of Science: 524; Staten Island Technical High School: 527; HSMSE @ CCNY: 532; HSAS @ Lehman: 516; Brooklyn Technical High School: 506; and The Brooklyn Latin School: 497.

The 9th Grade SHSAT cut-off scores tend to be much higher due to limited seats for incoming 10th graders in the schools. Some schools such as Stuyvesant and Bronx Science may only have 3-10 seats each year for incoming 10th graders while Brooklyn Technical High School, being the school with the most students, may only have around 20-30 seats. Depending on the year, the number of seats is available in the NYC High School Directory Book given to all students applying for admissions to a high school. Each year, an average 50-60 ninth-grade students get into the Specialized Schools, out of an estimated 3,000 students.

Past 9th Grade SHSAT Cut-off scores:

In 2021, the cutoff scores were the following: Stuyvesant High School: 560; Queens High School For The Sciences At York College: 475; The Bronx High School of Science: 510; Staten Island Technical High School: 520; HSMSE @ CCNY: 481; HSAS @ Lehman: 482; Brooklyn Technical High School: 495; and The Brooklyn Latin School: 466.

In 2022, the cutoff scores were the following: Stuyvesant High School: 563; Queens High School For The Sciences At York College: 541; The Bronx High School of Science: 551; Staten Island Technical High School: 525; HSMSE @ CCNY: 549; HSAS @ Lehman: 541; Brooklyn Technical High School; 546; and The Brooklyn Latin School: 545.

Department of Education programs
The New York Specialized High School Institute (SHSI) is a free program run by the City of New York for middle school students with high test scores on citywide tests and high report card grades. The program's original intent was to expand the population of Black and Hispanic students by offering them test-taking tips and extra lessons, however, anyone can apply. As of 2006, 3,781 students are enrolled at 17 locations. They spend 16 months, starting in the summer after sixth grade, preparing for the test.

Certain applicants who have scored just below the cut-off score and are recommended by their guidance counselor may qualify for the Summer Discovery Program. Successful completion of this program allows the students to gain admission to a specialized high school. The students must:

1. have scored within a range below the cut-off score on the SHSAT; and
2. be certified as disadvantaged by their middle school according to any one of the following criteria:
a. attend a Title 1 school and be from a family whose total income is documented as meeting federal income eligibility guidelines established for school food services by the NYS Department of Agriculture; or
b. be receiving assistance from the Human Resources Administration; or
c. be a member of a family whose income is documented as being equivalent to or below Department of Social Services standards; or
d. be a foster child or ward of the state; or
e. initially, have entered the United States within the last four years and live in a home in which the language customarily spoken is not English; and be recommended by their local school as having a high potential for the specialized high school program.

Fairness 
In November 2005, a New York Times article found that students scoring in the 90th percentile on both sections would not gain admittance to their first choice schools; meanwhile, those scoring in the 99th percentile on one section and the 50th percentile on the other, would. This happens because the final grade and percentile represent the total score and the curve within sections.

Admission is based solely on how the student does on the SHSAT. The New York City Department of Education created the New York Specialized High School Institute (SHSI), a free program run by the department for middle school students with high test scores on citywide tests and solid report card grades. The program's original intent was to expand the population of African American and Hispanic students in the science high schools by offering them test-taking tips and extra lessons; however, students of any racial or ethnic background can apply for admission to the institute. Just like the schools, however, these test-prep programs have seen attrition among black and Hispanic students.

In October 2013, it was reported that the number of African American and Latino students being admitted into SHSAT schools over the past five years had declined. In response, the Community Service Society and the NAACP Legal Defense Fund filed a complaint in the U.S. Department of Education's Office of Civil Rights (OCR), asserting that New York state law (the Hecht-Calandra Act of 1971) requires only three schools (Bronx High School of Science, Brooklyn Tech, and Stuyvesant) to use the SHSAT for admissions and that the five other schools that use the SHSAT for admission are not required to do so, and that their doing so violates the civil rights of black and Latino students. The position of the New York Department of Education is that applicants for all eight specialized high schools are legally required to take the SHSAT." The OCR opened an investigation which is still pending as of 2019.

In addition, many disagree with mayor Bill de Blasio's moves to increase the African American and Latino enrollment in the Specialized High Schools. As of 2015, there has been widespread dissent among Asian Americans, who account for 2/3 of the population attending the top 3 specialized high schools. The de Blasio administration began to look at alternatives to the SHSAT score as the sole means of admissions. Factors such as attendance, GPA, ethnicity, personal recommendation, and geographical locations are considered. A coalition of alumni associations, alumni, and parents of the SHS's was formed to combat these changes.

References

External links 
High Schools - Choices & Enrollment - New York City Department of Education
NYC DOE SHSAT Student Handbook 2010–2011 (PDF)

 
Standardized tests in the United States